Robert Fraisse may refer to:

 Robert Fraisse (cinematographer) (born 1940), French cinematographer
 Robert Fraisse (fencer) (born 1934), French Olympic fencer